Samuel Meredith (1741–1817) was an American merchant and politician who served as Treasurer of the United States from 1789 to 1801.

Samuel Meredith may also refer to:

Samuel Meredith (police officer) (1794–1873), British policeman who was the first person to be appointed to the rank of Chief Constable
Samuel Meredith (Western Samoan politician) (1877–1936), Western Samoan politician and businessman who served in the Legislative Council from 1929 to 1932